Juqan-e Kuchak (also Romanized as Jūqān-e Kūchak; also known as Jūqān and Jūghān-e Kūchak) is a village in Ujan-e Gharbi Rural District, in the Central District of Bostanabad County, East Azerbaijan Province, Iran. At the 2006 census, its population was 484, in 83 families.

References 

Populated places in Bostanabad County